The Ohio Department of Rehabilitation and Correction (DRC or ODRC) is the administrative department of the Ohio state government responsible for oversight of Ohio State Correctional Facilities, along with its Incarcerated Individuals. Ohio's prison system is the sixth-largest in America, with 27 state prisons and three facilities for juveniles. In December 2018, the number of inmates in Ohio totaled 49,255, with the prison system spending nearly $1.8 billion that year. ODRC headquarters are located in Columbus.

History
On 11 April 1993, a major riot broke out at the Southern Ohio Correctional Facility that resulted in ten deaths. Nine inmates and one corrections officer were killed.

In 2019, the Cleveland Plain-Dealer reported that the department's inspection office had a single full-time employee, and used interns to conduct inspections.

Facilities

 Allen Correctional Institution
 Belmont Correctional Institution
 Chillicothe Correctional Institution
 Correctional Reception Center
 Dayton Correctional Institution
 Franklin Medical Center (official capacity 690)
 Grafton Correctional Institution
 Hocking Correctional Facility
 Lebanon Correctional Institution
 London Correctional Institution
 Lorain Correctional Institution
 Madison Correctional Institution
 Mansfield Correctional Institution
 Marion Correctional Institution
 Noble Correctional Institution
 Northeast Reintegration Center (official capacity 590)
 Ohio Reformatory for Women
 Ohio State Penitentiary
 Pickaway Correctional Institution
 Richland Correctional Institution
 Ross Correctional Institution
 Southeastern Correctional Institution
 Southern Ohio Correctional Facility (Lucasville)
 Toledo Correctional Institution
 Trumbull Correctional Institution 
 Warren Correctional Institution

Juvenile Facilities

The Following Juvenile Correctional Facilities are operated by the Ohio Department of Youth Services.

 Circleville 
 Cuyahoga Hills
 Indian River

Private facilities 

 Lake Erie Correctional Institution (operated by CoreCivic)
 North Central Correctional Complex (operated by Management and Training Corporation)
 Northeast Ohio Correctional Center (operated by CoreCivic)

Closed 

 Lima Correctional Institution
 North Coast Correctional Treatment Facility (merged with Grafton in 2011)
 Ohio Penitentiary 
 Ohio State Reformatory 
 Orient Correctional Institution

Death row
The majority of male death row inmates are held at the Chillicothe Correctional Institution, while some that are considered a high security risk are held at the Ohio State Penitentiary and those with serious medical conditions are held at the Franklin Medical Center. Death row had been scheduled to move from Chillicothe Correctional Institution to Toledo Correctional Institution in the summer of 2017, however those plans were delayed and ultimately  cancelled in 2018 and death row remains at Chillicothe. Female death row inmates are housed in the Ohio Reformatory for Women. Executions occur at the Southern Ohio Correctional Facility. Information on death row inmates can be found here, the execution schedule here and execution history here.

Fallen officers

Since the establishment of the Ohio Department of Rehabilitation and Correction, 20 officers have died in the line of duty.

See also

 List of law enforcement agencies in Ohio
 List of United States state correction agencies
 List of U.S. state prisons
 Prison

References

External links
Ohio Department of Rehabilitation and Correction

Rehabilitation and Correction
State corrections departments of the United States
Lists of United States state prisons
Rehabilitation and Correction